Cirripectes gilberti is a species of combtooth blenny found in coral reefs in the Indian ocean.  This species reaches a length of  SL.

Etymology
The specific name honours the American ichthyologist Carter R. Gilbert of the Florida Museum of Natural History.

References

gilberti
Taxa named by Jeffrey T. Williams
Fish described in 1988